The Blytheville Air Force Base Capehart Housing Historic District encompasses a large residential area built between 1957 and 1962 as part of a military housing program for service members stationed at the now-closed Blytheville Air Force Base in Blytheville, Arkansas.  This area was developed pursuant to guidelines established by the Federal Housing Administration (FHA), and is laid out with curvilinear roads meeting in three-way intersections, specified lot sizes and setback requirements, and a small number of building designs with a modest number of exceptions.  The construction program under which this area was developed was named for Senator Homer Capehart, principal sponsor of the bill authorizing it.  The area is roughly bounded by Memorial Drive, Village and Westminster Avenues, and Northside, and has more than 400 residences, most of which are single-story duplex ranches.

The district was listed on the National Register of Historic Places in 2015.

See also
National Register of Historic Places listings in Mississippi County, Arkansas

References

Residential buildings completed in 1962
Historic districts on the National Register of Historic Places in Arkansas
National Register of Historic Places in Mississippi County, Arkansas
Blytheville, Arkansas
1962 establishments in Arkansas
Ranch house architecture